Tiago Carlos Morais Valente (born 24 April 1985) is a Portuguese professional footballer who plays for F.C. Tirsense as a central defender.

Club career
Born in Macedo de Cavaleiros, Bragança District, Valente started playing football with F.C. Paços de Ferreira, joining the club's youth system at the age of only eight and being promoted to the first team in 2004, making 15 Segunda Liga appearances with two goals in his first season. For 2005–06 he was loaned to fellow league team Gondomar SC, subsequently returning to Paços; he made his Primeira Liga debut for the latter on 26 November 2006, coming on as a 90th-minute substitute in a 2–0 home win against C.D. Aves.

Valente was linked with a move to English Football League Championship side Charlton Athletic in January 2008 for a reported fee of £1.5 million, but nothing came of it. In the same month of the following year, he was loaned to Aves until the end of the campaign, and a permanent contract was agreed in July 2009.

In June 2012, after three full seasons in the second division, playing all the games and minutes in 2011–12 to help his team finish in third position, narrowly missing out on promotion, Valente returned to Paços de Ferreira for a second spell.

References

External links

1985 births
Living people
Portuguese footballers
Association football defenders
Primeira Liga players
Liga Portugal 2 players
Segunda Divisão players
F.C. Paços de Ferreira players
Gondomar S.C. players
C.D. Aves players
F.C. Penafiel players
Vitória F.C. players
Varzim S.C. players
F.C. Tirsense players
Ekstraklasa players
Lechia Gdańsk players
Portugal youth international footballers
Portuguese expatriate footballers
Expatriate footballers in Poland
Portuguese expatriate sportspeople in Poland
Sportspeople from Bragança District